HLA-A11 (A11) is a human leukocyte antigen serotype within HLA-A "A" serotype group. The serotype is determined by the antibody recognition of α11 subset of HLA-A α-chains. For A11, the alpha "A" chain are encoded by the HLA-A allele group and the β-chain are encoded by B2M locus. This group currently is dominated by A*1101.  A11 and A are almost synonymous in meaning.
A11 is more common in East Asia than elsewhere, it is part of several long haplotypes that appear to have been frequent in the ancient peoples of Asia.

Serotype

Serotyping of A11 demonstrates better recognition of the *1101 gene products and poorer recognition of other A*11 gene products. There are ~40 recognized alleles of A*11.  There is only one null classified as A11.

In infectious disease
Associations have been observed between A11 and familial otosclerosis, pulmonary tuberculosis, leprosy, and cytomegalovirus infection with epilepsy.
These and other studies suggest an involvement between A11 and secondary effects of certain herpes virus infections.
A11 was also found increase in supraglottic cancer with poor 3 year survival. In osteosarcoma A11 was found elevated.

There is a strong association between anti-depressant induced hepatitis and HLA-A11. In autoimmune hepatitis, A11 has a synergistic effect, acting together with DR4 and DR3 to increase the odds of disease to over 300.

A11 is also part of a haplotype A11-Cw4-B35-DR1-DQ1 that is a second factor in the rapid progression of HIV. The involvement of non-Hodgkin's lymphoma primarily as a result of Epstein-Barr virus reinfection does not appear to be a cause in this acceleration.

Epstein–Barr virus anomaly
There are at least a couple of forms of lymphoproliferative diseases that appear to arise from unresolved Epstein–Barr virus infection. Examination of the virus itself has led to the discovery of strains that can all but turn off the A11-mediated class I response to the virus in A11 enriched peoples (see tables below). This ability to turn off the immune system and for the virus to remain active is a factor in carcinogenesis.  Early studies of A serotypes revealed and association of A11 with Hodgkin's lymphoma and recent studies have shown a complex involvement of Epstein-Barr virus infection as a consequence of low A11 control over infection.

Burkitt's lymphoma eventually lead to the discovery of the virus, however this disease is more evident in Africa. An involvement in cytotoxic T-lymphocytes down-regulation in Burkitt's lymphoma was subsequently discovered, More recent studies show A11 is down-regulated, and that other genetic defects are a likely cause. The ability to present EB virus antigens revealed a defect in the process after antigen process but before TAP1 involvement. Other studies indicated that peptides bind A11 in delivery to the cell surface for CTL screening, but fall off, and are destroyed intracellularly. However, A3 and A11 can process and load antigens even when proteosome activity is diminished suggesting an alternative mechanism for loading which may benefit in recovery from some disease but impair recovery of others.

It appears that these and other viruses have learned to exploit some defect in the region surrounding A11 that allows the near complete shut-down of gene expression. Oddly, in Africa A11 is at very low frequencies, and homozygotes are rare, suggesting that other genetic susceptibilities may exist that steer the virus toward Burkitt's lymphoma.

Alleles

Disease associations
A*1104 is associated with increased risk for cervical neoplasia resulting from human papillomavirus infection

A11-B haplotypes
A11-B13
A11-Cw2-B13 (Li)
A11-Cw9-B13 (Southern China & SE Asia)
A11-C10-B13 Buyi
A11-CBL-B13 Northern China

References

1